Newton Dam is an earthen dam about a mile north of Newton, in Cache County, Utah, United States.

Description
Original construction here dates from an earthen water-control project of 1872, built by LDS pioneers with ox and horsedrawn scrapers, the first large irrigation project in Utah and a contender for the first in the entire United States.  That structure was replaced by the United States Bureau of Reclamation, a mile and a half downstream, in 1941-1946.

The dam is 101 feet high and contains 5,600 acre-feet of water.  The impoundment of Clarkston Creek forms a reservoir of 350 surface acres, owned by the Bureau of Reclamation, and operated by the local Newton Water Users Association.

Historic dam and reservoir
The original dam and reservoir were added to the National Register of Historic Places in 1973 as Newton Reservoir. Originally built in 1871-1872 and rebuilt after wash-outs in 1874, 1877, and 1888, the dam was lined with rock and raised three feet in 1897. The capacity of the original reservoir was 1566 acre-feet. The historic boundaries start from the old dam and cover a portion of Clarkson Creek to the west.

See also

 List of dams and reservoirs in Utah
 National Register of Historic Places listings in Cache County, Utah

References

External links
 Utah Water Quality document

Buildings and structures in Cache County, Utah
Industrial buildings and structures on the National Register of Historic Places in Utah
Dams completed in 1872
Dams completed in 1946
Dams in Utah
Lakes of Cache County, Utah
United States Bureau of Reclamation dams
National Register of Historic Places in Cache County, Utah
1872 establishments in Utah Territory